Antonio Alberti was an Italian painter, active mainly in the 15th century in his native city of  Ferrara, as well as Bologna and Urbino.

Biography
He painted portraits and sacred subjects. For the sacristy of the church of San Bernardino, outside Urbino, he painted a Madonna and Child enthroned (1439). He painted frescoes in the Bolognini chapel at San Petronio Basilica in Bologna, consisting of incidents from the Passion, Paradise, and Inferno . He painted frescoes of the Virgin and child between saints Benedict and Sebastian (1433) for the inner choir of Sant' Antonio Abate in Ferrara. He had a son of the same name, who was also an artist, living in 1550. Onofrio Gabrieli and Fra Carnovale were his pupils. His grandson was Timoteo della Vite.

Gallery

References

Quattrocento painters
Italian male painters
15th-century Italian painters
Painters from Ferrara
Year of birth unknown
Year of death unknown
Fresco painters